John Burch (born John Alexander Burchell; 6 January 1932 – 18 April 2006) was an English pianist, composer and bandleader, equally at home playing traditional jazz, bebop, blues, skiffle, boogie-woogie and rock.

Life and career
Burch was born in London on 6 January 1932. Having started piano lessons at age 12, he played in army bands during his military service stationed in Germany and in the late 1950s toured military bases with his trio. In 1959, he toured France with bassist Jeff Clyne and saxophonist Bobby Wellins.

In 1960 Burch joined Allan Ganley's Jazzmakers. In the early and mid-1960s he led a quartet and an octet with Dick Heckstall-Smith, Ray Warleigh, Peter King, Hank Shaw and future Cream founders Ginger Baker and Jack Bruce. In the 1960s, Burch was one of many UK-based musicians who "moved easily between traditional jazz, bebop, blues, skiffle, boogie, and rock". As an accompanist, he played with American musicians who were visiting the UK; in 1966 these included Freddie Hubbard, Rahsaan Roland Kirk, and Red Rodney.

As a composer, he wrote "Preach and Teach" (1966) which provided the B-side of Georgie Fame and the Blue Flames' hit "Yeh Yeh" and was also recorded by Buddy Rich. He composed Fame's follow-up, "In the Meantime", and also its B-side, "Telegram".

He was also a teacher on the Barry Summer School jazz-education project, which was attended by pianist Keith Tippett.

In 1984, he re-formed the octet with Dick Morrissey. He dedicated his "Resurrection Ritual Suite" to Dick Morrissey and on his death had just completed a tribute to Ronnie Scott called "Just by Chance".

Burch died from cancer on 18 April 2006.

References

English composers
English jazz pianists
2006 deaths
1932 births
Morrissey–Mullen members